Golden Nugget Online is an online casino and sports betting operator. The company was split from Landry's, Inc. (owner of the Golden Nugget casinos chain), who still owns their controlling shares. The company is currently available in New Jersey and Michigan.

History
Golden Nugget first began dealing sports bets in New Jersey in 2018.

In December 2020, a deal was reached with The Greenbrier casino to get market access in West Virginia.

On February 24, 2021, the company gained New York access in deal with Tioga Downs casino.

In May 2022, Golden Nugget Online Gaming was acquired by the fantasy sports contest and sports betting company, DraftKings.

References

External links
 

Online casinos
Special-purpose acquisition companies
Companies based in Houston
Online gambling companies of the United States
Companies formerly listed on the Nasdaq
Sports betting